Kairua is a rural area of Tauranga in the Bay of Plenty region of New Zealand's North Island.  runs along its northern side, and crosses it at the northeast. Baypark Stadium is in the northwest of the area.

Kairua railway station opened on 2 September 1928, and closed 28 September 1957. The road between the railway station and Mount Maunganui was sealed in 1948.

Demographics

Baypark-Kairua had a population of 591 at the 2018 New Zealand census, an increase of 123 people (26.3%) since the 2013 census, and an increase of 90 people (18.0%) since the 2006 census. There were 165 households, comprising 297 males and 294 females, giving a sex ratio of 1.01 males per female. The median age was 34.3 years (compared with 37.4 years nationally), with 141 people (23.9%) aged under 15 years, 123 (20.8%) aged 15 to 29, 252 (42.6%) aged 30 to 64, and 72 (12.2%) aged 65 or older.

Ethnicities were 49.7% European/Pākehā, 59.9% Māori, 3.6% Pacific peoples, 2.5% Asian, and 1.0% other ethnicities. People may identify with more than one ethnicity.

The percentage of people born overseas was 10.7, compared with 27.1% nationally.

Although some people chose not to answer the census's question about religious affiliation, 32.0% had no religion, 26.9% were Christian, 36.5% had Māori religious beliefs and 1.5% had other religions.

Of those at least 15 years old, 48 (10.7%) people had a bachelor's or higher degree, and 96 (21.3%) people had no formal qualifications. The median income was $22,300, compared with $31,800 nationally. 45 people (10.0%) earned over $70,000 compared to 17.2% nationally. The employment status of those at least 15 was that 180 (40.0%) people were employed full-time, 84 (18.7%) were part-time, and 15 (3.3%) were unemployed.

References

Suburbs of Tauranga
Populated places around the Tauranga Harbour